The United States, represented by the United States Olympic Committee (USOC), competed at the 2016 Summer Olympics in Rio de Janeiro, from August 5 to 21, 2016. U.S. athletes have appeared in every Summer Olympics of the modern era, with the exception of the 1980 Summer Olympics in Moscow, which they boycotted. For the second consecutive time in the Summer Olympics, the United States was represented by more female than male athletes (264 men and 291 women).

The 2016 Olympics were the third most successful for the United States in terms of medal count (121) and the most successful not held in the United States: U.S. athletes won 239 total medals at St. Louis in 1904 and 174 at Los Angeles in 1984. These Games also witnessed the thousandth Summer Olympic gold medal for the Americans. The U.S. led all countries at the 2016 Games with 46 gold medals, 37 silver medals, 38 bronze medals, and 121 total medals.

Medalists

The following U.S. competitors won medals at the games. In the by discipline sections below, medalists' names are bolded.

|  style="text-align:left; width:78%; vertical-align:top;"|

|  style="text-align:left; width:22%; vertical-align:top;"|

 Athletes who participated in preliminary rounds but not the final round.

Competitors

| width=78% align=left valign=top |
The following is the list of number of competitors in the Games. Note that reserves in field hockey, football, and handball are not counted:

Archery

Three U.S. archers qualified for the men's events after having secured a top eight finish in the men's team recurve at the 2015 World Archery Championships in Copenhagen, Denmark. Another U.S. archer also qualified for the women's individual recurve by obtaining one of the eight Olympic places available from the same tournament.

Athletics (track and field)

U.S. athletes achieved qualifying standards in the following athletics events (up to a maximum of 3 athletes in each event). The team was selected based on the results of the 2016 United States Olympic Trials (July 1 to 10).

Six marathon runners (three per gender) were the first set of U.S. track and field athletes selected for the Games by virtue of their top three finish at the Olympic Team Trials in Los Angeles on February 13, 2016. One week later in Santee, California, three-time Olympian John Nunn joined them on the team by winning the men's  walk trials under the entry standard (4:06:00).

Two female race walkers (Michta-Coffey and Melville) were added to the U.S. track and field team by finishing among the top two within the qualifying standard (1:36:00) in the  walk at the first day of the Olympic Team Trials in Salem, Oregon. Meanwhile, Nunn won the men's race (1:25:37), but failed to achieve the entry standard of 1:24:00.

Following the completion of the Olympic Trials, a total of 126 athletes (61 men and 65 women) were named to the U.S. track and field team for the Games, with Bernard Lagat running in the long-distance at his fifth Olympics and hurdler Sydney McLaughlin establishing herself as the youngest (aged 16) in four decades. Apart from Lagat and McLaughlin, the U.S. team also featured six Olympic champions: sprinters Justin Gatlin (2004), LaShawn Merritt (2008), and Allyson Felix (2012), long jumper Brittney Reese, decathlete and world record holder Ashton Eaton, and triple jumper Christian Taylor. Hammer throwers Kibwe Johnson, Conor McCullough, and Rudy Winkler were added to the team on July 14, after the IAAF extended invitations to fill out the event.

At the Olympics, the U.S. led all countries with 13 gold medals, 10 silver medals, 9 bronze medals, and 32 total medals in athletics events.

Track & road events
Men

Women

# – During the second heat the United States missed their second handover which was caused by Franciela Krasucki of the Brazilian team bumping Allyson Felix as she approached the handoff to English Gardner. The American appeal was upheld, and they were given a second chance to qualify for the final, which the United States team accomplished with the number one qualifying time of 41.77.

Field events
Men

Women

Combined events – Men's decathlon

Combined events – Women's heptathlon

Badminton

The United States qualified a total of seven badminton players for each of the following events into the Olympic tournament. Howard Shu and Iris Wang were selected among the top 34 individual shuttlers each in the men's and women's singles, while the men's, women's, and mixed doubles players picked up the continental spot each as the highest-ranked pairs coming from the America zone in the BWF World Rankings as of May 5, 2016.

Basketball

Summary

Men's tournament

The U.S. men's basketball team qualified for the Olympics by winning the 2014 FIBA Basketball World Cup.

Team roster

Group play

Quarterfinal

Semifinal

Gold medal match

Women's tournament

The U.S. women's basketball team qualified for the Olympics by winning the 2014 FIBA World Championships.

Team roster

Group play

Quarterfinal

Semifinal

Gold medal game

Boxing

Eight U.S. boxers were entered to compete in each of the following weight classes into the Olympic tournament. Carlos Balderas was the only U.S. boxer finishing among the top two of his respective division in the World Series of Boxing. Meanwhile, four U.S. boxers (Hernandez, Stevenson, Conwell, and Mayer) claimed their Olympic spots at the 2016 American Qualification Tournament in Buenos Aires, Argentina.

London 2012 middleweight champion Claressa Shields was the U.S. female boxer to receive her Olympic spot with a quarterfinal victory at the World Championships in Astana, Kazakhstan. Antonio Vargas and Gary Antuanne Russell were the only Americans to secure additional places on the boxing team at the 2016 AIBA World Qualifying Tournament in Baku, Azerbaijan.

Boxers also had to compete at the Olympic Trials in Reno, Nevada to assure their selection to the U.S. team for the Games.

Men

Women

Canoeing

Slalom
U.S. canoeists qualified boats for the following events based on their performances from the 2015 Pan American Games and the World Championships. Apart from the Worlds, they also had to compete in each of the following distances at two selection stages of the Olympic Trials to assure their selection to the U.S. team for Rio 2016.

Sprint
The United States qualified a single boat in the women's K-1 500 m for the Games at the 2016 Pan American Sprint Qualifier in Gainesville, Georgia, as the quota spot had been passed to the highest finisher not yet qualified.

Qualification Legend: FA = Qualify to final (medal); FB = Qualify to final B (non-medal)

Cycling

Road
U.S. riders qualified for the following quota places in the men's and women's Olympic road races by virtue of their top 5 final national ranking in the 2015 UCI America Tour (for men) and top 22 in the 2016 UCI World Ranking (for women). As no men qualified automatically through a podium finish at a UCI World Tour event or a top-15 ranking in the UCI World Ranking, USA Cycling filled the quota spots via selection committee on June 23, 2016. The selection committee also nominated all four women athletes to the Games directly after all opportunities for automatic qualification had passed.

Men

Women

Track
Following the completion of the 2016 UCI Track Cycling World Championships, U.S. riders had accumulated spots in the women's team pursuit, as well as both the men's and women's omnium. Although the United States failed to earn a place in either men's or women's team sprint, they managed to secure an outright berth in the men's keirin, by virtue of their final individual UCI Olympic ranking in that event.

Two-time Olympic silver medalist Sarah Hammer automatically earned a selection to the U.S. track cycling team in the women's omnium with a superb runner-up finish at the 2016 UCI World Championships in London. The full U.S. Olympic track cycling squad was named on March 18, 2016.

Pursuit

Keirin

Omnium

Mountain biking
U.S. mountain bikers qualified for one men's and two women's quota places into the Olympic cross-country race, as a result of the nation's fifteenth-place finish for men and fifth for women, respectively, in the UCI Olympic Ranking List of May 25, 2016. The qualification period for mountain biking ended June 20, 2016, and as no bikers qualified automatically through top finishes at UCI Elite World Cup Cross-Country events or through the UCI World Ranking system, USA Cycling made official nominations via selection committee on June 23, 2016.

BMX
U.S. riders received three men's and two women's quota spots for BMX at the 2016 Summer Olympics. Two cyclists qualified by finishing in the top three at the 2016 UCI BMX World Championships. USA Cycling held an Olympic trial on June 11, 2016, to decide the second men's berth. The final two bikers were nominated via selection committee and announced on June 23, 2016.

Diving

U.S. divers qualified for seven individual spots and three synchronized teams at the Olympics through the 2015 FINA World Championships, and the 2016 FINA World Cup series. Divers had to attain a top two finish in the individual events and accumulate the highest score as a pair in each of the synchronized events at the 2016 U.S. Olympic Trials, held in Indianapolis, Indiana (June 18 to 26), to assure their coveted selection to the Olympic team.

Men

Women

Equestrian

U.S. equestrians qualified a full squad in the team dressage, eventing, and jumping competitions through the 2014 FEI World Equestrian Games and the 2015 Pan American Games.

Dressage
The long list for the dressage team was published on May 3. The final team was named in late June, after several observation trials in Compiègne, Roosendaal and Rotterdam. The final U.S. dressage team was named on June 27, 2016.

Eventing
The U.S. eventing team was named on June 20, 2016, with Phillip Dutton going to his sixth Olympics.

# – indicates that the score of this rider does not count in the team competition, since only the best three results of a team are counted.

Jumping
The U.S. jumping team was named on June 29, 2016, with double gold medalists Beezie Madden and McLain Ward going to their fourth straight Olympics.

# – The score of this rider was not counted in the team competition, since only the best three results of a team were counted.
* – Multiple riders finished with 0 penalties at the end of the finals round B and a jump-off was held to determine medals.

Fencing

U.S. fencers qualified a full squad each in the men's team foil and women's team sabre by virtue of their top four national finish in the FIE Olympic Team Rankings, while the women's épée team claimed the spot as the highest ranking team from America outside the world's top four.

In February 2016, Mariel Zagunis, a double Olympic champion (2004 and 2008), and Ibtihaj Muhammad, the first U.S. athlete to compete at the Games in a hijab, were the first two fencers to earn selection to the U.S. Olympic team by finishing in the top two of the national women's sabre team rankings. They were eventually joined by men's foil (Massialas, Meinhardt, and Chamley-Watson) and women's épée (Holmes and Hurley sisters) a few weeks later. Sabre fencers Eli Dershwitz and Daryl Homer, along with London 2012 Olympians Lee Kiefer and Nzingha Prescod, both in women's foil, claimed their spots on the U.S. team by finishing among the top 14 in the FIE Adjusted Official Rankings, while Jason Pryor did so as the top-ranked men's épée fencer from the America zone.

The full U.S. Olympic team was announced on April 11, 2016, at the USA Fencing Division I National Championships in Richmond, Virginia.

Men

Women

Field hockey

Summary

Women's tournament

U.S. women's field hockey team qualified for the Olympics by winning the 2015 Pan American Games.

Team roster

Group play

Quarterfinal

Football (soccer)

Summary

Women's tournament

The U.S. women's soccer team qualified for the Olympics by virtue of a top two finish at and by progressing to the gold medal match of the 2016 CONCACAF Olympic Qualifying Championship in Houston, Texas.

Team roster

Alternates: Ashlyn Harris, Emily Sonnett, Heather O'Reilly, Samantha Mewis

Group play

Quarterfinal

Golf 

The United States entered a total of seven golfers (four men and three women) into the first Olympic tournament since 1904. Rickie Fowler, Matt Kuchar, Patrick Reed, and Bubba Watson qualified directly among the top 15 players for the men's event, while Stacy Lewis, Gerina Piller, and Lexi Thompson did so for the women's based on the IGF World Rankings as of July 11, 2016.

Men

Women

Gymnastics 
These Olympic Games marked the first time the United States directly qualified a whole gymnastics team in all three modalities. The U.S. led all countries with 4 gold medals and 12 total medals in gymnastics events.

Artistic
The United States fielded a full squad of five gymnasts in both the men's and women's artistic gymnastics events through a top eight finish each in the team all-around at the 2015 World Artistic Gymnastics Championships in Glasgow. The U.S. Olympic Team Trials for men's artistic gymnasts were held on June 23 to 25, 2016 in concurrence with the P&G Gymnastics Championship for women. Meanwhile, the women's Olympic trials were held on July 8 to 10, 2016. John Orozco was originally named to the team, but announced that he suffered a torn anterior cruciate ligament and meniscus in his left knee on July 15 after dismounting from the horizontal bar at a training camp. He was replaced by Danell Leyva.

Men
Team

Individual finals

Women
Team

Individual finals

Rhythmic 
A squad of U.S. rhythmic gymnasts qualified for the individual and group all-around by finishing in the top 15 (for individual) and top 10 (for group) at the 2015 World Championships in Stuttgart, Germany. The 2016 USA Gymnastics Championship from June 8–13, 2016 served as the Olympic selection event for the rhythmic gymnastics team.

Individual

Group

Trampoline
The United States qualified one gymnast each in the men's and women's trampoline by virtue of a top eight finish at the 2016 Olympic Test Event in Rio de Janeiro. The 2016 USA Gymnastics Championships from June 8–13, 2016 served as the Olympic selection event for both men's and women's trampoline.

Judo

Six U.S. judokas qualified for each of the following weight classes at the Games. Five of them (three men and two women), led by reigning Olympic champion Kayla Harrison and London 2012 bronze medalist Marti Malloy, were ranked among the top 22 eligible judokas for men and top 14 for women in the IJF World Ranking List of May 30, 2016, while Angelica Delgado at women's half-lightweight (52 kg) earned a continental quota spot from the Pan American region, as the highest-ranked U.S. judoka outside of direct qualifying position. The judo team was formally named to the Olympic roster on June 1, 2016.

Men

Women

Modern pentathlon

U.S. modern pentathletes qualified for the following spots to compete in modern pentathlon. 2010 Youth Olympian Nathan Schrimsher secured a selection in the men's event and became the first athlete to qualify for the U.S. Olympic team after obtaining a top three finish and one of the Olympic slots from the Pan American Games. Meanwhile, London 2012 Olympian Margaux Isaksen qualified for the women's modern pentathlon as one of eleven top-ranked individuals in the UIPM World Rankings as of June 1, 2016. Isaksen was joined by her younger sister Isabella in the same event, as UIPM announced the re-allocation of the remaining spots for the Games.

Rowing

U.S. rowers qualified 11 out of 14 boats in each of the following classes into the Olympic regatta. Ten rowing crews confirmed Olympic places for their boats at the 2015 FISA World Championships in Lac d'Aiguebelette, France. Meanwhile, the men's eight was further added to the U.S. roster with a top two finish at the 2016 European & Final Qualification Regatta in Lucerne, Switzerland.

To secure their nomination to the U.S. team, the winners of the single, double, and lightweight double sculls (per gender) were determined at the Olympic Trials in Sarasota, Florida (April 17 to 24). Coxless pair rowers had to finish in the top four at the Lucerne leg of the FISA World Cup (May 27 to 29), or win at the second selection phase of the Olympic Trials (June 20 to 22), while those competing in the larger boats were named at a selection camp on June 20, 2016.

Men

Women

Qualification Legend: FA=Final A (medal); FB=Final B (non-medal); FC=Final C (non-medal); FD=Final D (non-medal); FE=Final E (non-medal); FF=Final F (non-medal); SA/B=Semifinals A/B; SC/D=Semifinals C/D; SE/F=Semifinals E/F; QF=Quarterfinals; R=Repechage

Rugby sevens

Summary

Men's tournament

The United States men's rugby sevens team qualified for the Olympics by winning the 2015 NACRA Sevens.

Team roster

Group play

Classification semifinal (9–12)

Ninth place match

Women's tournament

The United States women's rugby sevens team qualified for the Olympics by winning the 2015 NACRA Women's Sevens.

Team roster

Group play

Quarterfinal

Classification semifinal (5–8)

Fifth place match

Sailing

U.S. sailors qualified one boat in each of the following classes through the 2014 ISAF Sailing World Championships, the individual fleet Worlds, and other qualifying regattas. The U.S. Olympic team was determined based on the sailors' finishing positions, that is, their lowest series score from their respective class in selected major international regattas.

On February 15, 2016, U.S. Sailing Olympic team announced their selection for the 49er, 49erFX, and Nacra 17 to represent the country at the Rio regatta, based on the results at the ISAF World Cup meet and World Championships, both held in Florida. Meanwhile, the remaining single-handed sailors (Pascual, Buckingham, Paine, Lepert, and Railey), along with the 470 crews, claimed their Olympic spots at the European Championships and Princess Sofia Trophy Regatta.

Men

Women

Mixed

M = Medal race; EL = Eliminated – did not advance into the medal race

Shooting

U.S. shooters qualified for the Games by virtue of their finishes at the 2014 and 2015 ISSF World Championships, 2015 ISSF World Cup series, and designated selection competitions through the Olympic Point System, an opportunity to earn at least one medal in a given tournament and accumulate points within the threshold score (25 for rifle & pistol and 30 for shotgun). The remaining shooters were determined by the Olympic Team Selection trials to secure their spots in each event, as long as they obtained a minimum qualifying score (MQS) by March 31, 2016.

On September 17, 2015, Team USA announced the first six shooters to compete at the Games, including three-time Olympic medalist Matthew Emmons (2004) in rifle shooting, five-time Olympian Glenn Eller (2008) in men's double trap, and defending Olympic champion Vincent Hancock (2008 and 2012) in men's skeet. The remaining shooters were named to the U.S. team at three separate meets of the Olympic Team Trials: small-bore (April 1 to 8), shotgun (May 16 to 25), and air gun (June 3 to 5).

Men

Women

Qualification Legend: Q = Qualify for the next round; q = Qualify for the bronze medal (shotgun)

Swimming

U.S. swimmers achieved qualifying standards in the following events (up to a maximum of 2 swimmers in each event at the Olympic Qualifying Time (OQT), and potentially 1 at the Olympic Selection Time (OST)). To assure their selection to the U.S. team, swimmers had to attain a top two finish in each individual pool event under the Olympic qualifying time at the 2016 Olympic Trials (June 26 to July 3) in Omaha, Nebraska.

A total of 47 swimmers (25 men and 22 women) were named to the U.S. Olympic team at the end of the trials, with the most decorated Olympian Michael Phelps emerging as the first ever male American to compete at his fifth Games, long-distance ace Jordan Wilimovsky becoming the first to double in pool and open water, and Anthony Ervin making history as the oldest male to swim in an individual event since 1904. Notable swimmers also included 11-time medalist Ryan Lochte, world record holder Katie Ledecky, and reigning Olympic champions Missy Franklin, Dana Vollmer, and Allison Schmitt.

On August 11, 2016, Phelps set another historic record as the first ever swimmer to earn four consecutive gold medals in the men's 200 m individual medley. Ledecky's final medal total (four golds, one silver) is the most decorated single-Olympics performance by a U.S. female athlete in terms of gold medals, topping Missy Franklin (2012; four golds, 1 bronze), Simone Biles (2016; four golds, 1 bronze), and Amy Van Dyken (1996; four golds). The U.S. led all countries with 16 gold medals, 8 silver medals, 9 bronze medals, and 33 total medals in swimming events.

Men

Qualifiers for the latter rounds (Q) of all events were decided on a time only basis, therefore positions shown are overall results versus competitors in all heats.
* – Indicates athlete swam in the preliminaries but not in the final race.

Women

Qualifiers for the latter rounds (Q) of all events were decided on a time only basis, therefore positions shown are overall results versus competitors in all heats.
* – Indicates athlete swam in the preliminaries but not in the final race.

Synchronized swimming

Two U.S. synchronized swimmers claimed spots on the Olympic team in the women's duet by virtue of their seventh-place finish at the FINA Olympic test event in Rio de Janeiro.

Table tennis

Six U.S. table tennis players were entered into the Olympic competition. Jennifer Wu secured the American spot in the women's singles with a gold medal victory at the 2015 Pan American Games. Feng Yijun, Kanak Jha, and 2014 Youth Olympic bronze medalist Lily Zhang took the remaining Olympic berths on the U.S. team at the North American Qualification Tournament in Toronto, Canada. Jha was the first U.S. Olympian born in the 21st century.

London 2012 Olympian Timothy Wang and U.S. champion Zheng Jiaqi were each awarded the third spot to build the men's and women's teams for the Games as the top North American nation in the ITTF Olympic Rankings.

Men

Women

Taekwondo

Four U.S. athletes were entered into the taekwondo competition at the Olympics. Jackie Galloway qualified automatically for the women's heavyweight category (+67 kg) by finishing in the top 6 WTF Olympic rankings. Five-time Olympian and three-time Olympic medalist Steven López, 2011 Pan American Games bronze medalist Stephen Lambdin, and London 2012 bronze medalist Paige McPherson secured the remaining spots on the U.S. team by virtue of their top two finish in the men's welterweight (80 kg), men's heavyweight (+80 kg), and women's welterweight (67 kg) categories respectively at the 2016 Pan American Qualification Tournament in Aguascalientes, Mexico.

Tennis

Ten U.S. tennis players (four men, six women) were entered into the Olympic tournament, with the Williams sisters Venus (world no. 9) heading to her historic fifth Olympics and Serena (world no. 1) looking to defend her singles and doubles titles at her fourth. Alongside the Williams sisters, Madison Keys (world no. 16) and Sloane Stephens (world no. 20) qualified directly for the women's singles, as four of the top 56 eligible players in the WTA World Rankings. Meanwhile, rookies Brian Baker (world no. 596), Steve Johnson (world no. 39), Denis Kudla (world no. 56), and Jack Sock (world no. 27) did so for the men's singles based on their ATP World Rankings as of June 6, 2016. Baker used his protected ranking.

Twin brothers Bob and Mike Bryan led the Americans in the men's doubles, while Bethanie Mattek-Sands and CoCo Vandeweghe joined the Williams sisters in the women's doubles by virtue of their top ten ATP and WTA ranking, respectively. Four of the twelve Olympians comprised two mixed doubles teams. The pairings were decided in late July.

On July 30, 2016, the Bryan brothers announced that both of them withdrew from the Games due to concerns around a family health problem, missing an opportunity to defend their Olympic title. They were replaced in the men's doubles by Baker and Rajeev Ram.

Men

Women

Mixed

Triathlon

The United States qualified a total of six triathletes for the following events at the Olympics. Gwen Jorgensen secured a place in the women's triathlon as a result of her top three finish at the ITU World Qualification Event in Rio de Janeiro, while Sarah True earned her spot by finishing fourth at the same event. Meanwhile, Joe Maloy, Greg Billington, and Ben Kanute were ranked among the top 40 eligible triathletes in the men's event based on the ITU Olympic Qualification List as of May 15, 2016. Katie Zaferes was the last triathlete being chosen to the U.S. Olympic roster on May 24, 2016.

Men

Women

Volleyball

Beach
Four U.S. beach volleyball teams (two pairs per gender) qualified directly for the Olympics by virtue of their nation's top 15 placement in the FIVB Olympic Rankings as of June 13, 2016. Among the beach volleyball players were 2008 Olympic champion Phil Dalhausser, along with his rookie partner Nick Lucena, and newly formed Olympic duo of three-time gold medalist Kerri Walsh Jennings and London 2012 runner-up April Ross.

Indoor

Summary

Men's tournament

The U.S. men's volleyball team qualified for the Olympics by attaining a top two finish at the 2015 FIVB World Cup in Japan.

Team roster

Group play

Quarterfinal

Semifinal

Bronze medal match

Women's tournament

The U.S. women's volleyball team qualified for the Olympics by attaining a top finish and securing a lone outright berth at the North American Qualifier in Lincoln, Nebraska.

Team roster

Group play

Quarterfinal

Semifinal

Bronze medal match

Water polo

Summary

Men's tournament

The U.S. men's water polo team qualified for the Olympics, after securing a spot in the gold medal match and having attained an automatic berth by virtue of Olympic host nation Brazil's win in the other semifinal at the 2015 Pan American Games in Toronto, Canada.

Team roster

Group play

Women's tournament

The U.S. women's water polo team qualified for the Olympics by virtue of a top four finish at the Olympic Qualification Tournament in Gouda.

Team roster

Group play

Quarterfinal

Semifinal

Gold medal match

Weightlifting

U.S. weightlifters qualified three women's quota places for the Rio Olympics based on their combined team standing by points at the 2014 and 2015 IWF World Championships. One qualified automatically by virtue of top performances at these events. The others were selected following an Olympic trial on May 8, 2016. A single men's Olympic spot was added to the U.S. roster by virtue of a top seven national finish at the 2016 Pan American Championships. The team had to allocate these places to individual athletes by June 20, 2016.

Wrestling

The United States qualified a total of 14 wrestlers for the Olympics, the fewest since 1952. Five of them finished among the top six to book Olympic spots each in men's freestyle 74 & 97 kg, men's Greco-Roman 75 & 130 kg, and women's freestyle 75 kg at the 2015 World Championships, while four more licenses were awarded to U.S. wrestlers, who progressed to the top two finals at the 2016 Pan American Qualification Tournament. Four further wrestlers claimed the Olympic slots to round out the U.S. roster in separate World Qualification Tournaments; three of them each in men's freestyle 85 kg and women's freestyle 48 & 53 kg at the initial meet in Ulaanbaatar, and one more in men's Greco-Roman 59 kg at the final meet in Istanbul.

To assure their selection to the U.S. Olympic team, wrestlers had to claim a top spot of each division at the 2016 Olympic Trials (April 8 to 10) in Iowa City, Iowa. Among them were London 2012 gold medalist Jordan Burroughs and World champions Helen Maroulis, Kyle Snyder, and Adeline Gray. On May 11, 2016, Frank Molinaro, who finished third in men's freestyle 65 kg at the final meet in Istanbul, was awarded a final Olympic spot on the U.S. wrestling team after an original qualifier withdrew.

Men

Women

See also
United States at the 2015 Pan American Games
United States at the 2016 Winter Youth Olympics
United States at the 2016 Summer Paralympics

References

External links 

 Official website of United States Olympic Committee and Team USA
 NBC Olympics coverage
 

Summer Olympics
Nations at the 2016 Summer Olympics
2016